The Changchun Institute of Optics, Fine Mechanics and Physics (CIOMP), of the Chinese Academy of Sciences (CAS), is a research institution in Changchun, Jilin, China.

It was founded in 1952 as the Institute of Instrumentation of the CAS, by a group of scientists led by Wang Daheng. It was later renamed as the Changchun Institute of Optics and Fine Mechanics. The current name was adopted in 1999 when the institute was merged with the Changchun Institute of Physics, headed by Xu Xurong.

Under the leadership of Wang Daheng, the institute played a crucial role in the development of China's strategic weapons, developing high-precision optics for missile guidance systems. It made major breakthroughs for the submarine-launched ballistic missile program.

The institute focuses on luminescence, applied optics, optical engineering, and precision mechanics and instruments. It is involved in a number of technology ventures based out of the nearby CAS Changchun Optoelectronics Industrial Park with total assets worth US$403 million. 

The institute offers undergraduate, master’s and doctoral education programs.

The institute developed the Bilibili Video Satellite, launched in September 2020.

CGSTL 
The institute includes the Chang Guang Satellite Technology Corporation (Charming Globe or CGSTL), a commercial offshoot of the institute which manufactures remote sensing satellite buses and unmanned aerial vehicles (drones). Chang Guang Satellite Technology owns Jilin-1 satellite constellation.

It already has 31 satellites in orbit and plans to have their constellation reach 138 satellites over the next 4 years.

See also 
 Jilin-1

References 

Research institutes of the Chinese Academy of Sciences
Education in Changchun
1952 establishments in China
Optics institutions
Mechanics
Physics institutes
Educational institutions established in 1952